Panackapalam is a small town of meenachil taluk located in the Kottayam district of Kerala state, India.

References

Panackapalam